Świńka (Polish medieval language for "Boar") is a Polish coat of arms. It was used by several szlachta (noble) families.

History

Świńka is one of the oldest coats of arms in Poland. According to legend, the history of the Świńka family began in 712, when a certain Biwoj, squire to Queen Libusza, gave her a giant boar that he had hunted down in the forest. The queen rewarded him with the coat of arms, the village of Świny (Swinehausen) in Silesia, and her daughter.

Blazon

Notable bearers
Notable bearers of this coat of arms have included:
 Józef Zajączek, Prince, General
 Andrzej Czacki, Catholic bishop
 Jakub Świnka (1283–1314), Archbishop of Gniezno
 Włodzimierz Krzyżanowski, General in US Civil War

Gallery

See also
 Polish heraldry
 Heraldic family
 List of Polish nobility coats of arms

External links 
  Swinka Coat of Arms and bearers.

Bibliography
 Nieznana szlachta polska i jej herby - Wiktor Wittyg
 Herby Rodów Polskich (Polish Coats of Arms) - Mieczysław Paszkiewicz , reprint of "Herby Szlachty Polskiej" - Zbigniew Leszczyc, 1908

Polish coats of arms